The Point Pleasant Rail Bridge is a truss bridge that carries the West Virginia Secondary over the Ohio River between Gallia County, Ohio and Point Pleasant, West Virginia.  At the present time, the bridge is being used by the Kanawha River Railroad for transporting goods from point to point via rail, but it was once used by Norfolk Southern, Conrail, Penn Central, and the New York Central Railroad.

See also
List of crossings of the Ohio River

Further reading
Point Pleasant-Kanauga Railroad Bridge at Bridges & Tunnels

Railroad bridges in West Virginia
Norfolk Southern Railway bridges
New York Central Railroad bridges
Bridges over the Ohio River
Buildings and structures in Gallia County, Ohio
Buildings and structures in Mason County, West Virginia
Transportation in Mason County, West Virginia
Transportation in Gallia County, Ohio
Railroad bridges in Ohio
Cantilever bridges in the United States